James Edward Kelly (29 December 1907 – 27 July 1984) was an English professional footballer who played as a full back in the Football League for Southport, Barrow,  Grimsby Town, Bradford Park Avenue and York City, in Norwegian football for Trondheim and in non-League football for Dawdon Colliery and Murton Colliery. He later worked as a trainer at Barrow and Oldham Athletic and scouted for Grimsby.

References

1907 births
1984 deaths
Sportspeople from Seaham
Footballers from County Durham
English footballers
Association football defenders
Dawdon Colliery Welfare F.C. players
Murton A.F.C. players
Southport F.C. players
Barrow A.F.C. players
Grimsby Town F.C. players
Bradford (Park Avenue) A.F.C. players
York City F.C. players
English Football League players
Oldham Athletic A.F.C. non-playing staff
Grimsby Town F.C. non-playing staff
Expatriate footballers in Norway
English expatriate sportspeople in Norway
English expatriate footballers